Lis is a female given name, sometimes short for Elisabeth. People with that name include:
Lis Ahlmann (1894–1979), Danish weaver and textile designer
Lis Brack-Bernsen (born 1946), Danish and Swiss mathematician, historian of science, and historian of mathematics
Lis Frost (born 1961), Swedish cross country skier
Lis Groes (1910–1974), Danish politician
Lis Harris, American author and critic
Lis Hartel (1921–2009), Danish equestrian
Lis Howell, British journalist, television executive, and academic
Lis Jacobsen (1882–1961), Danish philologist, archaeologist and writer
Lis Jensen (born 1952), Danish social worker and politician
Lis Jeppesen (born 1956), Danish ballerina
Lis Lauritzen (born 1971), Danish cruise ship captain
Lis Lewis, American voice coach
Lis Løwert (1919–2009), Danish film actress
Lis Mellemgaard (born 1924), Danish ophthalmologist and resistance fighter
Lis Møller (1918–1983), Danish journalist and politician
Lis Nilheim (born 1944), Swedish actress
Lis Rhodes (born 1942), British artist and feminist filmmaker
Lis Sladen (1946–2011), English television actress
Lis Sørensen (born 1955), Danish pop singer
Lis Verhoeven (born 1931), German actress and theatre director
Lis Wiehl (born 1961), American novelist, legal scholar, and television personality

See also
Lis Shoshi, male Kosovan professional basketball player
Lis (surname)